Pop My Culture was a podcast hosted by comedic actors and improvisers Cole Stratton and Vanessa Ragland. Broadcast approximately weekly, it is an informal, conversational show about movies, television, music, gossip, etc. with the two hosts and their celebrity guests. The show was named the #2 Best Comedy Podcast of the Moment by Rolling Stone, one of the Top 20 Comedy Podcasts of 2013 by Paste Magazine, and one of 10 Favorite Comedy Podcasts by IFC.com. and Mashable.com. The show launched March 2, 2010 with inaugural guest Samm Levine, and joined the Nerdist Network  of shows in December 2011. They have done live recordings at SF Sketchfest, The Rooftop Comedy Festival in Aspen, Co., the LA Podfest, the 2015 Wondercon in Anaheim, CA, and the 2016 Wondercon in Los Angeles, CA.

The Podcast concluded in January 2017, with their 213th and final episode, recorded live at SF Sketchfest with guests Paul F. Tompkins, Samm Levine and Rhett Miller.

Episode list

2010

2011

2012

2013

2014

2015

2016

2017

References

External links

Comedy and humor podcasts
Audio podcasts
Nerdist Industries
2010 podcast debuts